Sheldon High School is a rural public high school in Sheldon, Iowa, serving students of the Sheldon Community School District in grades 9-12. The school mascot is the Orab, a portmanteau of the school colors, orange and black. Athletic competitions have taken place in the Siouxland Conference since 2009, when the school moved from the Lakes Conference.

Athletics
The Orabs are members of the Siouxland Conference, and participate in the following sports:
Football
Cross Country
 Boys' 1971 Class A and 1981 Class 2A State Champions
Volleyball
Basketball
 Boys' 2013 Class 2A State Champions
Wrestling
Golf
 Boys' 1960 Class B State Champions
Track and Field
 Boys' 1982 Class 3A State Champions
 Girls' 1984 Class 2A State Champions
Baseball
Softball

The Sheldon boys basketball team secured a berth in the 2013 Iowa High School basketball tournament, and went on to win the 2A state championship by upsetting #1 ranked West Fork of Sheffield 48-36 in the final. This was Sheldon's first state title in basketball, and their first appearance in the state tournament since 1977.

Sheldon High School Summer Theatre
Begun in 1972 by Jay Shelp, Sheldon High School Summer Theatre is the only high school repertory company in the state of Iowa and one of only a few in the United States. SHSST presents six full-length shows over the course of six weeks during June and July.  Students are responsible for all aspects of production. The program is mainly staffed by SHSST alumni.  Lissa Lane-Johnson directs the program.

Notable people

Alumni
Terry Brands, wrestler
Tom Brands, wrestler
AG Kruger, hammer thrower

Faculty
Bob Vander Plaats, former principal

See also
List of high schools in Iowa

References

Public high schools in Iowa
Schools in O'Brien County, Iowa
Sheldon, Iowa